William Bertrand (died 28 July 1094), known as William V or Bertrand I or II, was the count and margrave of Provence from 1051 to his death. He succeeded his father Fulk Bertrand on his death in that year, but did not receive the margravial title at first, for it went to his uncle Josfred.

William Bertrand co-ruled for his entire life with his uncle and cousins, though he received the margravial rank upon his uncle's death in 1062. In 1081, Bernard renounced his allegiance to the Holy Roman Emperor and swore fealty to the Papacy. When he died, the margraviate was inherited by Raymond IV of Toulouse.

His first wife was Theresa, daughter of Ramiro I of Aragon. His second wife was Adelaide of Cavenez. Their daughter, Adelaide, inherited Forcalquier from her uncle, Geoffrey II of Provence.

Notes

Sources
Medieval Lands: Provence.

1094 deaths
Counts of Provence
Year of birth missing